Kate Cook may refer to:
 Kate Cook (author), British nutrition and wellness expert, and author
 Kate Cook (singer), Australian country singer
 Kate R. Cook, American lawyer and government official